The sodium-hydrogen antiporter 1  (NHE-1)  also known as sodium/hydrogen exchanger 1 or SLC9A1 (SoLute Carrier family 9A1) is an isoform of sodium–hydrogen antiporter that in humans is encoded by the SLC9A1 gene.

Function 
The Na+/H+ antiporter (SLC9A1) is a ubiquitous membrane-bound enzyme involved in volume- and pH-regulation of vertebrate cells. It is inhibited by the non-specific diuretic drug amiloride and activated by a variety of signals including growth factors, mitogens, neurotransmitters, tumor promoters, and others.

Interactions 
Sodium–hydrogen antiporter 1 has been shown to interact with carbonic anhydrase II and CHP. It is also the target of the experimental drug rimeporide, which is being developed for the treatment of Duchenne muscular dystrophy.

References

Further reading 

 
 
 
 
 
 
 
 
 
 
 
 
 
 
 
 
 
 
 
 
 
 
 

Solute carrier family